Ion Neculce (1672–1745) was a Moldavian chronicler. His main work, Letopisețul Țărâi Moldovei [de la Dabija Vodă până la a doua domnie a lui Constantin Mavrocordat] (The Chronicles of the land of Moldavia [from the rule of Dabija Vodă to the second rule of Constantin Mavrocordat) was meant to extend Miron Costin's narrative, covering events from 1661 to 1743.

Life
Ion Neculce was born in 1672. Under Antioh Cantemir he was made a Spatharios and second in rank in the army after the voivode), but achieved his highest rank under the rule of Dimitrie Cantemir when he was made grand hatman for supporting Peter I of Russia in the Russo-Turkish wars.

When the Russians lost the war, Ion Neculce, alongside Dimitrie Cantemir, went to Russia. He spent a few years there, until 1719 when he returned to Moldova, where under the rule of Constantin Mavrocordat was appointed vornic. This was his last function before dying in 1745.

Works
Letopiseţul Ţărâi Moldovei (de la Dabija Vodă până la a doua domnie a lui Constantin Mavrocordat);
O samă de cuvinte

Gallery

External links
 

1672 births
1745 deaths
Spatharii of Moldavia
Hetmans of Moldavia
Early Modern Romanian writers
Moldavian and Wallachian chroniclers
17th-century Romanian people
18th-century Romanian people